Misi Kabanda sometimes known as Hajjat Misi Kabanda is the current cabinet and minister for Kampala Capital City and Metropolitan Affairs. She was one of the ministers who finalized plans for the company to assemble and manufacture buses to ease transport needs in the greater Kampala Metropolitan Area (GKMA)  through Kampala Capital City Authority and the METU bus industries. However, President Museveni rejected Loans for Importation of Buses.

See also 

 List of government ministries of Uganda
 Parliament of Uganda
 Cabinet of Uganda
 Dorothy Kisaka

References

External links 
 Website of the Parliament of Uganda
 Website of Kampala Capital City Authority

Members of the Parliament of Uganda
Kampala Capital City Authority
Living people
Women members of the Parliament of Uganda
Year of birth missing (living people)